Ita Marija Kozakeviča (3 July 1955 - 28 October 1990) was a Latvian Polish philologist, journalist and social worker.

Biography
Born in Riga, 3 July 1955, Kozakeviča was a graduate of Latvian State University, specializing in French Philology. She later worked in publishing as an editor, journalist, and translated numerous works, 
being able to speak Latvian, French, Russian, Polish, Spanish, German, Belarusian, Ukrainian and Georgian.

In 1988, she was elected as President of the newly-established Union of Poles in Latvia, and was one of the Latvian SSR People's Forum organizers in December 1988, which later became the Latvian National Culture Societies Association. In 1989 she elected as a board member of the City Council of Riga, and was elected to the Supreme Council of the Republic of Latvia, representing the Popular Front of Latvia, where she was responsible for human rights issues.

On 28 October 1990, while visiting Italy, Kozakēviča drowned swimming in the Tyrrhenian Sea off the town of Gaeta, two days before she was due to meet the Pope at the Worldwide Polish Society Conference at the Vatican. She was buried at St. Michael Cemetery in Riga.

References

1955 births
1990 deaths
Writers from Riga
Latvian people of Polish descent
Popular Front of Latvia politicians
Deputies of the Supreme Council of the Republic of Latvia
Latvian philologists
Women philologists
Latvian journalists
Latvian women writers
Latvian women journalists
Latvian human rights activists
20th-century Latvian women writers
20th-century Latvian writers
University of Latvia alumni
Deaths by drowning
20th-century journalists
20th-century philologists